The National School of Rural Engineering, Water Resources and Forestry (École nationale du génie rural, des eaux et des forêts, or ENGREF), was a department of Agro ParisTech for foresters and students of the Corps of Bridges, Waters and Forests, that was still an independent institution up until 2006.

It was created in 1964, from the merger of the French National School of Forestry (École nationale des eaux et forêts, or National School of Water Resources and Forestry) and the National School of Rural Engineering (École nationale du génie rural) and became part of AgroParisTech (Institut des sciences et industries du vivant et de l’environnement, or Paris Institute of Technology for Life, Food and Environmental Sciences) in 2006.

See also 
 Agro ParisTech
 French National School of Forestry
 List of historic schools of forestry

References

External links 
 Nature index
 Forest portal
 

Agronomy schools
Forestry education
Engineering universities and colleges in France
Environmental educational institutions
Universities and colleges in Nancy, France
Forestry in France
History of forestry education
ParisTech
Educational institutions established in 1964
1964 establishments in France